Lak Dasht (also Romanized as Lāk Dasht; also known as Lāk Dasht-e Bozorg) is a village in Chapakrud Rural District, Gil Khuran District, Juybar County, Mazandaran Province, Iran. At the 2006 census, its population was 232, in 51 families.

References 

Populated places in Juybar County